St Joseph's Convent High School, Mumbai is an all-girls school in Vile Parle, Mumbai, India. It is a Catholic educational institution under The Sisters of St Joseph of Tarbes (in France).

History
The school was established in Mumbai in 1963 by the sisters of St Joseph of Tarbes, and is a government school managed by the nuns and teachers. The school building was made by Mother Mechtilde, Sr. Seraphie and other sisters who came to Mumbai from France via Bangalore.

Features
The AV room has modern sound and audio systems. Other  facilities include a library and many laboratories. The school is equipped with modern technology known as 'The Smart Class'. The school building has three levels, and there are plans to add a fourth level to cater for a First and Second year junior college.

References

Sisters of Saint Joseph schools
Catholic secondary schools in India
Christian schools in Maharashtra
Girls' schools in Maharashtra
High schools and secondary schools in Mumbai
Educational institutions established in 1963
1963 establishments in Maharashtra